Boston Market Corporation, known as Boston Chicken until 1995, is an American fast casual restaurant chain headquartered in Golden, Colorado. It is owned by the Rohan Group.

Boston Market has its greatest presence in the Northeastern and Midwestern United States, but also has a large presence in California, Florida, and Texas. , the chain has approximately 346 company-owned restaurant locations in 28 states, Puerto Rico, and Ramstein-Miesenbach, with 14,000 employees. In the early 2000s, Boston Market operated two locations in Toronto, Ontario. In early 2002, Boston Market entered the Australian market, opening nine stores in the Sydney metropolitan area by 2004, before converting some stores to McDonald's and quietly exiting the Australian market later that year due to competitive pressures.

History
Boston Chicken was founded by Steven Kolow and Arthur Cores in 1985 in Newton, a suburb of Boston. The chain expanded rapidly in the early and mid-1990s. The company raised a lot of debt to finance its expansion. The rapid expansion allowed the company to create a steady stream of revenue from one-time development fees and increasing royalties, but also raised interest rates on its development loans. In 1998, the company filed for Chapter 11 bankruptcy. Boston Market was purchased by McDonald's Corporation in May 2000. McDonald's purchased the company for its real estate, but found the brand serviceable and therefore continued to operate and expand. In 2007, McDonald's announced that it was "exploring strategic options" for the subsidiary. On August 6, 2007, McDonald's announced plans to sell the chain to Sun Capital Partners, a transaction that was completed on August 27, 2007.

When it was known as Boston Chicken, restaurants specialized in rotisserie chicken and a variety of side dishes, but in February 1995, the chain expanded its menu to include turkey, meatloaf, and ham and changed the name to Boston Market in fall 1995 to reflect this. However, the corporate name remained "Boston Chicken, Inc." until 1997, when it became so popular with the new name, the corporate name was changed to "Boston Market Corporation." In 1996, the chain launched a line of sandwiches known as "Boston Carver Sandwiches" that feature chicken, turkey, ham, and meatloaf; in 1997, due to the success of the new line, the "Extreme Carver" sandwiches were launched, filled with more portions of the above meats and more cheese than the originals. In 2005, Boston Market also started offering limited-time offers, such as Crispy Country Chicken, an oven-baked chicken breast with gravy. Baked whitefish, haddock or cod was also offered on Fridays during Lent. Boston Market continues to introduce new items and flavors, such as their popular BBQ Ribs, Oven Crisp Chicken, and Parmesan Tuscan Chicken Premium Dish. In April 2018, Boston Market announced that it was expanding its menu to offer rotisserie prime rib nationwide, three days a week.

Boston Chicken created the Einstein Bros. Bagels chain of bakery cafés in 1995, after acquiring several smaller chains of bagel-centric bakeries.

A selection of Boston Market-branded items have been available since April 1999 in many supermarkets across the United States. In April 2004, Boston Market introduced chilled menu items to be sold at supermarkets. In December 2005, these chilled menu items were available in 700 supermarkets. Frozen meals and side dishes are sold nationally under the Boston Market brand name; these were previously manufactured by H. J. Heinz Company and Overhill Farms of Vernon, California, until Overhill Foods was purchased by Bellisio Foods of Duluth, Minnesota. Boston Market also provides catering for any size event for office meetings, office holiday parties, and private events, available with delivery or pick-up at the restaurant.

In April 2020, Sun Capital Partners sold Boston Market to Engage Brands, LLC, a company of Rohan Group, owned by Jignesh Pandya.

Menu
Boston Market's menu primarily features rotisserie chicken.

Trademark dispute
In 2002, Boston Pizza commenced a lawsuit against Boston Market in the Federal Court of Canada over the trademark use of the word "Boston" in Canada. In its defense, Boston Market alleged that Boston Pizza's trademarks were invalid because it described a style of pizza from a specific area. The dispute continued after Boston Market ceased operations in Canada in 2004. The parties settled the dispute in 2008 under an agreement that Boston Market would not use the words "Boston" or "Boston Market" in Canada for five years for restaurants or any food or drink products (other than pre-packaged food products, but not including pizza and lasagna). Boston Market also agreed that it will not challenge Boston Pizza's use in Canada of any trademark that uses the words "Boston" or "Boston Pizza" (with certain exceptions).

See also
 Chicken restaurant
 List of fast-food chicken restaurants

References

External links
 
 100 Meals: Boston Market Home Video Contest Winner Personal Documentary
 "How I Did It," Inc. Magazine article with Boston Market founder George Naddaff

Companies based in Golden, Colorado
Companies based in Middlesex County, Massachusetts
Newton, Massachusetts
Restaurants in Colorado
Economy of the Northeastern United States
Regional restaurant chains in the United States
Fast-food chains of the United States
Former McDonald's subsidiaries
Restaurants established in 1985
1985 establishments in Massachusetts
Companies that filed for Chapter 11 bankruptcy in 1998
Heinz brands
Fast-food franchises
Fast casual restaurants
Fast-food poultry restaurants
2000 mergers and acquisitions
2007 mergers and acquisitions